The 1999–2000 Michigan Wolverines men's basketball team represented the University of Michigan in intercollegiate college basketball during the 1999–2000 season. The team played its home games in the Crisler Arena in Ann Arbor, Michigan, and was a member of the Big Ten Conference.  Under the direction of head coach Brian Ellerbe, the team finished tied for seventh in the Big Ten Conference.  The team earned an eight seed but was defeated in the first round of the 2000 Big Ten Conference men's basketball tournament.  The team earned an invitation to the 2000 National Invitation Tournament, where it was eliminated in the first round. The team was unranked for all eighteen weeks of Associated Press Top Twenty-Five Poll, and it also ended the season unranked in the final USA Today/CNN Poll. The team posted a 1–7 record against ranked opponents. Its lone victory occurred on January 7, 2000, against Illinois by a 95–91 margin in overtime at Crisler Arena.

Josh Asselin, Darius Taylor and Peter Vignier served as team captains, and LaVell Blanchard and Kevin Gaines shared team MVP  honors.  The team's leading scorers were LaVell Blanchard (404 points), Kevin Gaines (339 points) and Jamal Crawford (283 points).  The leading rebounders were Blanchard (224), John Asselin (155) and Pete Vignier (114).

The team twice surpassed the school single-game record total of 34 free throws made set on December 9, 1998, when they totaled 37 against Illinois on January 16, 2000, and then with 38 against Iowa on March 1, 2000.  The single-game total of 38 continues to be the school record.

In the 2000 Big Ten Conference men's basketball tournament at the United Center from March 9–12, Michigan was seeded eighth.  In the first round they lost to number 9  76–66.

On March 15, 2000, Michigan lost to Notre Dame 75–65 at the Joyce Center in South Bend, Indiana, in the first round of the 2000 National Invitation Tournament.

Team players drafted into the NBA

See also
Michigan Wolverines men's basketball
2000 National Invitation Tournament
NIT all-time team records
NIT bids by school and conference
NIT championships and semifinal appearances

References

Michigan Wolverines men's basketball seasons
Michigan
Michigan
Michigan
Michigan